"2000" is a song by Kent, a famous Swedish alternative rock band. It is the theme song for the Swedish TV-series Hemlös (Swedish for "Homeless"), and all proceeds were donated to the Foundation for the Homeless of Stockholm, Stockholms hemlösa. The song topped the Swedish Singles Chart for 1 week on the week ending 13 November 2009.

Charts

References

2009 songs
2009 singles
Number-one singles in Sweden
Kent (band) songs